The 2017 Alabama Crimson Tide baseball team represents the University of Alabama in the 2017 NCAA Division I baseball season. The Crimson Tide will play their home games in the newly renovated Sewell–Thomas Stadium.

Personnel

Returning starters

Roster

Coaching staff

Schedule and results

! style="background:#FFF; color:#8b0000;" |Regular Season
|- valign="top" 

|- bgcolor="#ccffcc"
| February 17 ||   ||Sewell–Thomas Stadium || 4–3 || N. Eicholtz (1–0) || B. Kehner (0–1) || B. Love (1) ||4,637 || 1–0||–
|- bgcolor="#ccffcc"
| February 18 || Presbyterian  ||Sewell–Thomas Stadium || 8–1 ||J. Walters (1–0)  || T. Chock (0–1) ||None  || 4,668|| 2–0||– 
|- bgcolor="#ffbbbb"
| February 19 || Presbyterian   || Sewell–Thomas Stadium|| 3–4 ||W. Smith (1–0)  ||G. Suchey (0–1)  || None || 4,324|| 2–1||–
|- bgcolor="#ccffcc"
| February 21 ||  || Sewell–Thomas Stadium || 12–5 ||Z. Rogers (1–0)  ||J. Keys (0–1)  || D. Vainer (1) || 3,711|| 3–1||–
|- bgcolor="#ffbbbb"
| February 24 ||  || Sewell–Thomas Stadium ||3–6 || G. Glaze (1–0) || S. Potter (0–1) || R. McCollough (2) ||4,161|| 3–2||–
|- bgcolor="#ffbbbb"
| February 25 || Oral Roberts || Sewell–Thomas Stadium ||4–5 || J. McMinn (0–1) || J. Walters (1–1) || K. Stout (1) || 3,966|| 3–3||–
|- bgcolor="#ffbbbb"
| February 26 || Oral Roberts  || Sewell–Thomas Stadium || 2–5 || M. Asusua (1–0) ||  B. Love (0–1)||  None|| 3,475 || 3–4||–
|- bgcolor="#ffbbbb"
| February 28 || || Sewell–Thomas Stadium ||1–2(10) || J. Hoyt (1–0) || D. Vainer (0–1) || None || 3,411|| 3–5||–
|-

|- bgcolor="#ccffcc"
| March 1||   || Sewell–Thomas Stadium ||4–3 || B. Love (1–1) || K. Backofen (0–2) ||None  || 5,867|| 4–5||–
|- bgcolor="#ccffcc"
| March 3 || Louisiana–Monroe ||Sewell–Thomas Stadium||6–2 ||J. Walters (2–1)  || K. Curtis (0–3) ||G. Suchey (1) || 4,127|| 5–5||– 
|- bgcolor="#ccffcc"
| March 4 || Louisiana–Monroe ||Sewell–Thomas Stadium ||  10–3 || S. Finnerty (1–0) || C. Beal (1–1) ||None  || 3,520|| 6–5||–
|- bgcolor="#bbbbbb"
| March 7 ||   ||Sewell–Thomas Stadium || colspan=8 |Postponed
|- bgcolor="#ccffcc"
| March 9||  ||Sewell–Thomas Stadium ||6–5 || G. Suchey (1–1) || T. Sanchez (0–2) ||D. Vainer (2) || 2,949|| 7–5||–
|- bgcolor="#ccffcc"
| March 10 || AR–Pine Bluff ||Sewell–Thomas Stadium || 14–1 ||J. Walters (3–1)  || C. Lewington (0–2) ||None || 3,067|| 8–5||– 
|- bgcolor="#ffbbbb"
| March 12 || AR–Pine Bluff ||Sewell–Thomas Stadium || 3–8 || N. Sawrie (1–2) ||  B. Love (1–2)||  None|| – || 8–6||–
|- bgcolor="#ccffcc"
| March 12 || AR–Pine Bluff || Sewell–Thomas Stadium || 12–2 ||D. Duarte (1–0) || T. Lopez (1–3) ||None  || 2,866 || 9–6||–
|- bgcolor="#ccffcc"
| March 14 ||   ||Sewell–Thomas Stadium ||5–0 || G. Rukes (1–0) || B. Allen (0–4) ||None || 2,677|| 10–6||–
|- bgcolor="#ffbbbb"
| March 15 ||   ||Sewell–Thomas Stadium||10–3 || C. Shelton (1–0) || S. Finnerty (1–1) || W. Burns (7) || 2,953||10–7||–
|- bgcolor="#ffbbbb"
| March 17 || #23  || Sewell–Thomas Stadium ||0–3 || T. Houck (3–1) || J. Walters (3–2) || T. Sikkema (2) || 3,194|| 10–8||0–1
|- bgcolor="#ffbbbb"
| March 18 || #23 Missouri  ||Sewell–Thomas Stadium ||4–7 || M. Plassmeyer (4–0) || D. Duarte (1–1) || None || 3,428|| 10–9||0–2
|- bgcolor="#ffbbbb"
| March 19 || #23 Missouri ||Sewell–Thomas Stadium ||5–9 || C. Bartlett (3–0) || G. Rukes (1–1) || T. Sikkema (3) || 3,418|| 10–10||0–3
|- bgcolor="#ccffcc"
| March 21 ||vs.  ||Regions Field |||4–1 || G. Rukes (2–1) || D. Munger (1–1) ||D. Vainer (3) || 1,152|| 11–10||–
|- bgcolor="#ccffcc"
| March 24 || at #13 ||Founders Park||4–2 ||J. Walters (4–2)  || A. Hill (1–3) ||G. Suchey (2) || 6,727|| 12–10||1–3 
|- bgcolor="#ffbbbb"
| March 25 || at #13 South Carolina ||Founders Park ||5–6(10) || J. Reagan (3–0) || D. Vainer (0–2) || None || 8,242|| 12–11||1–4
|- bgcolor="#ffbbbb"
| March 26 || at #13 South Carolina ||Founders Park || 2–4 ||J. Parke (1–1)  ||G. Suchey (1–2)  || C. Bowers (3) || 7,152|| 12–12||1–5
|- bgcolor="#ffbbbb"
| March 28† ||vs. #10  ||Riverwalk Stadium ||3–4 || C. Herndon (1–0)|| S. Finnerty (1–2) || A. Mitchell (1) ||7,605 || 12–13||–
|- bgcolor="#ffbbbb"
| March 31 || #17  ||Sewell–Thomas Stadium|| 1–7 || B. Knight (4–1) || J. Walters (4–3) || None || 4,894 || 12–14||1–6
|-

|- bgcolor="#ccffcc"
|April 1 || #17  ||Sewell–Thomas Stadium|| 7–1 || D. Duarte (2–1) || T. Stephan (4–2) || None ||4,202 || 13–14||2–6
|- bgcolor="#ffbbbb"
|April 2 || #17 Arkansas ||Sewell–Thomas Stadium|| 5–8 ||C. Chadwick (3–0)  ||G. Suchey (1–3)  || None || 4,483|| 13–15||2–7
|- bgcolor="#ffbbbb"
|April 4 ||at  ||Riddle–Pace Field ||11–12 ||M. Skinner (2–2)  ||Z. Rogers (1–1)  || None || 3,328|| 13–16||–
|- bgcolor="#bbbbbb"
| April 5 ||   ||Sewell–Thomas Stadium || colspan=8 |Canceled
|- bgcolor="#ffbbbb"
|April 7 ||at ||Swayze Field || 2–7 || J. McArthur (2–1) || D. Duarte (2–2) || None || 8,456|| 13–17||2–8
|- bgcolor="#ffbbbb"
|April 8 ||at Ole Miss ||Swayze Field||4–5 ||D. Woolfolk (3–1)  ||G. Suchey (1–4)  || None || 10,247|| 13–18||2–9
|- bgcolor="#ffbbbb"
|April 9 ||at Ole Miss||Swayze Field||2–8 || R. Rolison (4–1)|| S. Finnerty (1–3) || None ||7,597 || 13–19||2–10
|- bgcolor="#ccffcc"
|April 11 ||||Sewell–Thomas Stadium|| 6–4 || G. Suchey (2–4) || M. Calvert (0–1) || M. Oczypok (1) ||3,268 || 14–19||–
|- bgcolor="#ffbbbb"
|April 13 ||||Sewell–Thomas Stadium ||5–9 || C. Sherrod (4–1)||  J. Walters (4–4)  ||None  ||3,458 ||14–20||2–11
|- bgcolor="#ffbbbb"
|April 14 ||Texas A&M ||Sewell–Thomas Stadium ||2–8 || C. Martin (4–2) || D. Duarte (2–3) || None || 4,087 ||14–21||2–12
|- bgcolor="#ffbbbb"
|April 15 || Texas A&M||Sewell–Thomas Stadium || 2–3 || K. Chafin (3–0) ||  G. Suchey (2–5)|| M. Kilkenny (5) || 4,477|| 14–22||2–13
|- bgcolor="#ccffcc"
|April 18 ||||Sewell–Thomas Stadium || 18–1(7) ||D. Medders (1–0)  || P. McMahon (0–2) || None || 3,045|| 15–22||–
|- bgcolor="#ffbbbb"
|April 20 ||at #14 ||Dudy Noble Field ||5–6 || K. Pilkington (4–3) ||   D. Duarte (2–4) || S. Price (14) || 6,890 || 15–23||2–14
|- bgcolor="#ffbbbb"
|April 21 || at #14 Miss. St. ||Dudy Noble Field|| 3–4 || P. Plumlee (5–1)  || 'N. Eicholtz (1–1) ||R. Self (1)  || – || 15–24||2–15
|- bgcolor="#ffbbbb"
|April 22 || at #14 Miss. St.||Dudy Noble Field ||12–13(13) || B. Blaylock (1–0) || T. Adams (0–1) || None || 8,270 || 15–25||2–16
|- bgcolor="#ffbbbb"
|April 25 || ||Sewell–Thomas Stadium ||8–11 || T. Simpson  (2–3) || G. Suchey (2–6) || J. Hoyt (4) || 3,410|| 15–26||–
|- bgcolor="#ffbbbb"
|April 27 || #14  ||Sewell–Thomas Stadium||2–8 || A. Lange (5–4) || D. Duarte (2–5) || None || 3,666 || 15–27||2–17
|- bgcolor="#ffbbbb"
|April 28 || #14 LSU ||Sewell–Thomas Stadium||4–7 || J. Pocher (7–3)  || N. Eicholtz (1–2) || H. Newman (6) || 4,464 || 15–28||2–18
|- bgcolor="#ffbbbb"
|April 29 || #14 LSU ||Sewell–Thomas Stadium||3–4(11) || H. Newman (1–1) || D. Vainer (0–3) || None || 4,918|| 15–29||2–19
|-

|- bgcolor="#ccffcc"
|May 5 ||at #5  ||Plainsman Park  ||  4–3 ||  J. Walters (5–4)  || K. Thompson (5–3)  ||D. Vainer (4)  || 4,096|| 16–29||3–19
|- bgcolor="#ccffcc"
|May 6 ||at #5 Auburn ||Plainsman Park|| 7–6 || Z. Rogers (2–1) ||A. Mitchell (5–2)|| D. Vainer (5) || 4,013 || 17–29||4–19
|- bgcolor="#ccffcc"
| May 7 ||at #5 Auburn ||Plainsman Park  ||11–9(15) ||  S. Potter (1–1)   || R. Watson (1–1)  ||  G. Suchey (3)||3,614 || 18–29||5–19
|- bgcolor="#bbbbbb"
|May 9 || at ||Griffin Stadium ||colspan=8 |Canceled
|- bgcolor="#ccffcc"
|May 10 ||  ||Sewell–Thomas Stadium ||12–2(8) ||  D. Medders (2–0)||  D Beizer (5–6) ||None  || 2,799|| 19–29 ||–
|- bgcolor="#ffbbbb"
|May 12 || #7 ||Sewell–Thomas Stadium || 1–2 ||  ||  ||  || || 19–30||5–20
|- bgcolor="#ffbbbb"
|May 13 || #7 Florida ||Sewell–Thomas Stadium|| 6–13 ||  ||  ||  || || 19–31||5–21
|- bgcolor="#ffbbbb"
|May 14 ||#7 Florida ||Sewell–Thomas Stadium|| 5–10 ||  ||  ||  || || 19–32||5–22
|- bgcolor="#ffbbbb"
|May 18 ||at  ||Hawkins Field ||1–18 ||  J. Raby (9-3) || D. Medders (2-1)''' || None'' || 2,904 || 19–33||5–23
|- bgcolor="#ffbbbb"
|May 19 ||at Vanderbilt ||Hawkins Field || 1–13 ||  ||  ||  || || 19–34||5–24
|- bgcolor="#FFFFE0"
|May 20 ||at Vanderbilt ||Hawkins Field|| 3–3(8) ||  ||  ||  || || 19–34||5–24
|-

† Indicates the game does not count toward the 2017 Southeastern Conference standings.
*Rankings are based on the team's current  ranking in the Collegiate Baseball poll.

Honors and awards
 None

Record vs. conference opponents

Rankings

See also
 2017 Alabama Crimson Tide softball team

References

Alabama
Alabama Crimson Tide baseball seasons
Alabama Crimson Tide baseball